Fallout was the debut album released by the Mayfield Four, an American rock band. The album spawned two singles: "Don't Walk Away" and "Always." "Inner City Blues" is a cover of a Marvin Gaye song, "Inner City Blues (Make Me Wanna Holler)."

This album features a much more soul-influenced sound than their second album, Second Skin, which moved the band's music into a more hard rock direction.  The themes explored on this album touch upon love, heartbreak and redemption.

Track listing

References

1998 debut albums
Albums produced by Jerry Harrison
The Mayfield Four albums